Rodney Wallace Burns (born 17 June 1988) is a Costa Rican former professional footballer who played as a winger.

Club career

Youth and college
Wallace's family moved to the United States when he was nine. He grew up in Rockville, Maryland, played for Potomac Soccer Association and attended The Bullis School, and played college soccer at the University of Maryland, College Park.

Professional

D.C. United 
Wallace was drafted in the first round (6th overall) of the 2009 MLS SuperDraft by D.C. United on 15 January 2009.  He made his professional debut on 22 March 2009, in D.C.'s first game of the 2009 MLS season against Los Angeles Galaxy, and scored his first career professional goal on 26 April 2009, in a 3–2 win over New York Red Bulls. As both a defender and midfielder, Wallace played 39 regular-season games and made 36 starts over his two years with D.C. United, compiling three goals and five assists.

Portland Timbers 
On 24 November 2010, D.C. United traded Wallace and a fourth-round pick in the 2011 MLS SuperDraft to Portland Timbers in exchange for Dax McCarty and allocation money.

Wallace re-signed with Portland on 6 December 2012. In summer 2014, Wallace was sent on loan to USL Pro club Arizona United to regain match fitness after returning from injury.

Wallace returned to the Portland Timbers at the beginning of the 2015 season. He served as a regular starter all of the regular season. In the 2015 Audi MLS Cup playoffs, Wallace played a vital role in the team's success, scoring a goal against Sporting Kansas City in the knockout rounds. They went on to win that game in a penalty shootout 7–6 in what was the longest penalty shootout in MLS Cup playoffs history. The Timbers would go on to win the Western Conference Championship against FC Dallas and enter their first ever MLS Cup Final. Wallace came up big in the final, scoring what would go on to be the game winner in the 7th minute. The final score was 2–1.

Arouca 
Wallace signed with Portuguese Primeira Liga side F.C. Arouca in January 2016.

Sport Recife 
Two months after signing with Arouca, on 30 March 2016, Sport Recife signed Wallace on a two-year contract, expiring at the end of the 2017 season. According to some Brazilian sources, the transfer fee between Sport Recife and Arouca was 200,000 euros. Wallace went on to make 24 appearances for Sport Recife, scoring four goals in the 2016 season.

Following rumors in the beginning of January 2017 that Wallace had no intentions of returning to Brazil, Wallace failed to report to the first day of preseason on 9 January 2017. Sport Recife subsequently set a deadline of 13 January 2017, for Wallace to return or present a plausible reason for non-attendance. On 16 January 2017, Wallace responded asking to be released. While Wallace and Sport Recife remained at an impasse for nearly a month, rumors began to swirl of a possible return to his former club, Portland Timbers. Wallace and Sport Recife finally reached resolution when he returned to Brazil and re-paid the club's 200,000 euro transfer fee on 1 February 2017. Sport Recife released Wallace from his contract the next day on 2 February 2017. Following his release, rumors have continued to persist of a possible return to the Timbers.

New York City FC
Wallace signed with New York City FC on 15 February 2017. He scored his first goal for the club on 12 March, in a 4–0 win over D.C. United.

Sporting Kansas City 
On 14 December 2018, Wallace signed one-year contract with Sporting Kansas City. He was out of contract after the 2019 season.

Retirement 
After nearly two-years without a club, Wallace officially retired on 13 August 2021. He signed a ceremonial one-day contract with Portland Timbers allowing him to officially retire as a Timbers player.

International career
During his first season in Portland, Wallace established himself as a starter at left midfield for the expansion club. His efforts earned him a call to represent Costa Rica in September. He made his international debut on 2 September 2011 at the Home Depot Center in Carson, California, and scored the only goal in a 1–0 victory over the United States. As of December 2014, Wallace has earned a total of 17 caps, scoring 3 goals. He represented his country in 3 FIFA World Cup qualification matches.

In May 2018 he was named in Costa Rica's 23 man squad for the 2018 FIFA World Cup in Russia. This was the third time a member of his family played at a FIFA World Cup, as his relative Harold Wallace played in both the 2002 and 2006 World Cups.

Career statistics

International

International goals
Scores and results list. Costa Rica's goal tally first (includes one unofficial goal).

Personal life
Wallace holds a U.S. green card which qualifies him as a domestic player for MLS roster purposes.

He is a relative of former footballer Harold Wallace; while some sources report that Rodney is Harold's nephew, other sources indicate that they are cousins.

Honours
University of Maryland
NCAA Division I Men's Soccer Championship: 2008

Portland Timbers
MLS Cup: 2015
Western Conference (playoffs): 2015
Western Conference (regular season): 2013

Individual
MLS Comeback Player of the Year Award: 2014

References

External links
Portland Timbers bio

University of Maryland bio

1988 births
Living people
Association football wingers
Campeonato Brasileiro Série A players
Copa Centroamericana-winning players
Costa Rica international footballers
Costa Rican expatriate footballers
Costa Rican expatriate sportspeople in Brazil
Costa Rican expatriate sportspeople in the United States
Costa Rican footballers
D.C. United draft picks
D.C. United players
Expatriate footballers in Brazil
Expatriate soccer players in the United States
F.C. Arouca players
Liga Portugal 2 players
Major League Soccer All-Stars
Major League Soccer players
Maryland Terrapins men's soccer players
New York City FC players
Phoenix Rising FC players
Portland Timbers players
Soccer players from Maryland
Sport Club do Recife players
Sporting Kansas City players
Sportspeople from Rockville, Maryland
Footballers from San José, Costa Rica
USL Championship players
2013 Copa Centroamericana players
2013 CONCACAF Gold Cup players
2014 Copa Centroamericana players
2017 CONCACAF Gold Cup players
2018 FIFA World Cup players